Nadia Coolen (born 17 August 1994) is a Dutch football forward who plays for PSV Eindhoven.

Honours 
PSV
Winner
 KNVB Women's Cup (1): 2020-2021

Runner-up
 KNVB Women's Cup (4): 2013–2014, 2016-2017, 2017-2018, 2021-2022

VVV
Runner-up
 KNVB Women's Cup: 2011–12

References

External links
 

1994 births
Living people
Dutch women's footballers
Eredivisie (women) players
PSV (women) players
VVV-Venlo (women) players
Women's association football forwards
People from Sittard
Footballers from Limburg (Netherlands)